Aluniș may refer to:

Populated places

Romania
 Aluniș, Cluj, a commune in Cluj County
 Aluniș, Mureș, a commune in Mureș County
 Aluniș, Prahova, a commune in Prahova County
 Aluniș, a village in Frumușeni Commune, Arad County
 Aluniș, a village in Mioarele Commune, Argeș County
 Aluniș, a village in Colți Commune, Buzău County
 Aluniș, a village in Cornățelu Commune, Dâmbovița County
 Aluniș, a village in Pietrari Commune, Dâmbovița County
 Aluniș, a village in Căpreni Commune, Gorj County
 Aluniș, a village in Mugeni Commune, Harghita County
 Aluniș, a village in Benesat Commune, Sălaj County

Moldova

Aluniș, Rîșcani, a commune in Rîșcani district

Rivers in Romania
 Aluniș, a small river in the city of Brașov
 Aluniș (Călata), a tributary of the Călata in Cluj County
 Aluniș, a tributary of the Cracăul Negru in Neamț County
 Aluniș, a tributary of the Homorodul Mic in Harghita County
 Aluniș, a tributary of the Săcuieu in Cluj County
 Aluniș (Vărbilău), a tributary of the Vărbilău in Prahova County
 Aluniș, a tributary of the Vițău in Suceava County

See also
Alunișu (disambiguation)
Alunișul (disambiguation)